Blažov can refer to:
a part of the municipality Kútniky in Slovakia
Blažov (Javorina), a former municipality in northern Slovakia